is a professional Japanese football player for Kyoto Sanga FC in J2 League.

Career
He plays as a defender. Kyohei made his debut for Sagan Tosu on 10 July 2011 against Kataller Toyama.

He is the twin brother of Kohei Kuroki.

Club statistics
Updated to end of 2018 season.

References

External links
Profile at Kagoshima United FC
Profile at Oita Trinita
Profile at Renofa Yamaguchi

1989 births
Living people
Fukuoka University alumni
Association football people from Kumamoto Prefecture
Japanese footballers
J1 League players
J2 League players
J3 League players
Japan Football League players
Sagan Tosu players
Ehime FC players
Verspah Oita players
Renofa Yamaguchi FC players
Oita Trinita players
Kagoshima United FC players
Kyoto Sanga FC players
Association football defenders
Twin sportspeople
Japanese twins